Radu Gavrilaş (born 5 April 1952) is a Romanian athlete. He competed in the men's decathlon at the 1972 Summer Olympics.

References

1952 births
Living people
Athletes (track and field) at the 1972 Summer Olympics
Romanian decathletes
Olympic athletes of Romania
Place of birth missing (living people)